River Ridge is an unincorporated community in Utica Township, Clark County, Indiana, United States.

Geography

References

Unincorporated communities in Clark County, Indiana
Unincorporated communities in Indiana
Louisville metropolitan area